The siege of Ochakov (1737) was a siege during the Austro-Russian–Turkish War (1735–39) in which the Russian army, led by Burkhard Christoph von Münnich, captured the Ottoman fortress of Ochakov. It took place in 1737.

The siege

The first Russian attack was repelled with heavy losses, but as a result of Russian mortar fire, a fire broke out, and on the second day a powder magazine within the city blew up, killing  around 6,000 defenders. The fortress quickly surrendered and in the ensuing slaughter, all but 3,000 of the garrison were killed. The stench of decaying corpses was such that the Russians had to withdraw 15 miles from the fortress.

Notes

References

Sources

Europe and the world, 1650–1830, Jeremy Black

Conflicts in 1737
Ochakov (1737)
Ochakov (1737)
Military history of Ukraine
1737 in the Ottoman Empire
1737 in the Russian Empire
1730s in Ukraine
Russo-Turkish War (1735–1739)